Soviet-occupied Latvia may refer to:
 Latvian Soviet Socialist Republic
 Soviet occupation of Latvia in 1940
 Soviet re-occupation of Latvia in 1944

See also 
 Baltic states under Soviet rule (1944–1991)
 German occupation of the Baltic states during World War II
 German occupation of Latvia during World War II
 List of military occupations of Latvia
 Museum of the Occupation of Latvia
 Occupation of Latvia by Nazi Germany
 Occupation of the Baltic states
 Soviet occupation of the Baltic states (1940)
 Soviet occupation of the Baltic states (1944)